Erenkaya is a village in the Eruh District of Siirt Province in Turkey. The village is populated by Kurds of the Jilyan tribe and had a population of 234 in 2021.

References 

Villages in Eruh District
Kurdish settlements in Siirt Province